
Gmina Mieleszyn is a rural gmina (administrative district) in Gniezno County, Greater Poland Voivodeship, in west-central Poland.

Villages
Gmina Mieleszyn contains the villages and settlements of Borzątew, Dębłowo, Dobiejewo, Dziadkówko, Dziadkowo, Karniszewo, Kowalewko, Kowalewo, Łopienno, Mieleszyn, Mielno, Nowaszyce, Popowo Podleśne, Popowo Tomkowe, Popowo-Ignacewo, Przysieka, Sokolniki, Świątniki Małe and Świątniki Wielkie.

Neighbouring gminas
Gmina Mieleszyn is bordered by the gminas of Gniezno, Janowiec Wielkopolski, Kłecko, Mieścisko and Rogowo.

References
Polish official population figures 2006

Mieleszyn
Gniezno County